Donghicola tyrosinivorans is a Gram-negative, tyrosine-degrading, aerobic and non-motile bacterium from the genus of Donghicola which has been isolated from seawater from the Jeju Island in Korea.

References 

Rhodobacteraceae
Bacteria described in 2015